is a Japanese former tennis player. She reached the world No. 1 ranking in women's doubles on the WTA Tour and had a career-high singles ranking of world No. 8, achieved on February 9, 2004. In her career, she won six singles and 38 doubles titles, including three Grand Slam titles (one with Julie Halard-Decugis and two partnering Kim Clijsters), and one Grand Slam mixed doubles title (partnering Mahesh Bhupathi). Sugiyama held the all-time record, for both male and female players, for her 62 consecutive Grand Slam main-draw appearances, until she was surpassed by Roger Federer at the 2015 Wimbledon Championships.

Career

1990s
In 1993, at age 17, Sugiyama played tennis legend Martina Navratilova in her native city, losing in three sets. The same year, she made her Grand Slam debut at Wimbledon but lost in the first round to world No. 30, Gigi Fernández, in three sets. In 1994, Sugiyama again reached the main draw at Wimbledon but lost to world No. 6 and compatriot, Kimiko Date. Later that year, she reached her first singles final in Surabaya but was forced to retire against Elena Wagner. She went on to win the Japan Open doubles, her first tour title. Later that year, she broke into the WTA top 100. In 1995, she won her first Grand Slam match and reached the fourth round of Roland Garros. In the first round, the Japanese player defeated 15th-seeded Grand Slam runner-up and former top-5 player Helena Suková by 9–7 in the final set, her first victory over a top-20 player. Two months after, she defeated Amanda Coetzer to reach the third round, while losing to world No. 4 and former Wimbledon champion, Conchita Martínez. In November, she made an impressive run at the Oakland Tier-II tournament. While she was only ranked 63, she defeated 22nd-ranked Irina Spîrlea, former Wimbledon runner-up Zina Garrison Jackson, and No. 10, Lindsay Davenport to reach the second final of her career, where she lost to No. 7, Magdalena Maleeva. After this run, Sugiyama broke into the top 50.

In 1996, she reached the third round at the Australian Open. In Miami, seeded 23rd, Sugiyama reached the fourth round, defeating No. 10, Jana Novotná, her second top-10 victory. That moved her into the top 30. She also reached the semifinals of the Japan Open in Tokyo and the fourth round at Wimbledon, where she defeated No. 5, Anke Huber, her third top-10 and first top-5 victory. She represented Japan and reached the third round at the Atlanta Olympics defeating Martina Hingis.

Sugiyama began 1997 season by playing her third final losing to Elena Likhovtseva, after defeating Sabine Appelmans in the quarterfinals. The following week she reached the second round at the Australian Open. In April, she won her first professional title at the Japan Open against Amy Frazier. However, she could not reach a good result in Grand Slam events, with a second-round exit at the French Open and US Open and a first round loss at Wimbledon. At the end of the year, she reached her first Tier-I final at the Kremlin Cup in Moscow, defeating Natasha Zvereva, No. 14 Brenda Schultz-McCarthy, No. 9 and multi-Grand Slam events winner Arantxa Sánchez Vicario, and Dominique Van Roost before failing in the final against top seed and second-ranked Jana Novotná.

In 1998, she opened with a second singles title in Gold Coast. Then she broke into the top 20 and reached another semifinal in Sydney, defeating Conchita Martínez. Throughout that year, Sugiyama showed consistency: a third WTA Tour title at the Japan Open, quarterfinals in Tokyo (Pan Pacific), Berlin, defeating No. 4, Amanda Coetzer, playing Strasbourg and San Diego, defeating Steffi Graf, Luxembourg, third round in Indian Wells, Miami and Montreal and second round at both French and US Open. In 1999, she reached the final of the Japan Open, the semifinals in Gold Coast and Tokyo (Princess Cup) defeating No. 8, Julie Halard-Decugis, the quarterfinals in Strasbourg and Moscow, defeating No. 6, Mary Pierce, third in Indian Wells, Montreal, defeating No. 7, Jana Novotná, and at the US Open. She also reached the second round at the French Open and Wimbledon. The same year, Sugiyama won the US Open mixed doubles with Mahesh Bhupathi, her first Grand Slam title.

Sugiyama received the WTA Sportsmanship Award in 1999.

2000–2005
On July 10, Sugiyama reached the final of the women's doubles at Wimbledon, partnered by Halard-Decugis, but lost in straight sets to the Williams sisters after a one-day rain delay. On September 10, she won the women's doubles at the US Open, defeating Cara Black and Elena Likhovtseva in three sets, in one hour and 19 minutes. On October 23, she became the first Japanese woman to rank No. 1 in the world in doubles, winning seven titles in the process.

Her greatest success was Scottsdale 2003. Beating Lindsay Davenport in the second round, she went on to defeat Eleni Daniilidou to progress to the semifinals. Scheduling problems forced both the semifinals and finals matches - for both singles and doubles - to be played on the Sunday of the tournament. Thus in a single day, Sugiyama managed to save a matchpoint in the semifinals against Alexandra Stevenson, rally from a set down to defeat doubles partner Kim Clijsters in the final, and then secure victories in both doubles matches to raise both trophies. The year 2003 proved to be her best year ever, pushing Serena Williams to the limit at Roland Garros and reaching the round of 16 in Wimbledon and US Open where her fourth round loss to Francesca Schiavone at Flushing Meadows was rather controversial. She finished the year ranked tenth, having defeated world No. 1, Justine Henin, in the round robin section of the season-ending championships. She also won a total of eight doubles titles that year, seven with Kim Clijsters (Sydney, Antwerp, Scottsdale, Roland Garros, Wimbledon, San Diego, Zurich) and one with Liezel Huber (Linz).

Sugiyama began 2005 with four consecutive first-round losses. She lost in the first rounds of the first three Grand Slams; only at San Diego did she really do well, making it to the final, which she lost in straight sets to Mary Pierce, having defeated Daniela Hantuchová, Sesil Karantacheva and Svetlana Kuznetsova en route. Sugiyama also reached the final in doubles with Hantuchová, losing to Virginia Ruano-Pascual and Conchita Martínez. She broke her Grand Slam "curse", reaching the third round before losing to Clijsters, the eventual champion.

That year, Ai had better results in doubles than in singles. Partnering with Elena Dementieva, she reached the finals of her first tournament, Sydney, losing to Bryanne Stewart and Samantha Stosur. They reached the round of 16 at the Australian Open. She entered a few tournaments with Anastasia Myskina and Elena Likhovtseva, but with poor results. In Berlin, she played again with Daniela Hantuchová, reaching the semifinal, losing to Black and Huber. At the French, they lost to Birnerová and Vanc in the second round. They won their next tournament, in Birmingham over Daniilidou and Russel. At Wimbledon, Hantuchová and Sugiyama reached the quarterfinal, losing to eventual champions Black and Huber. At the Canadian Open in Toronto, they lost the semifinal to eventual champions Grönefeld and Navratilova. At the US Open, they reached the third round, losing to Yan Zi and Zheng Jie. She tried three partners in the next tournaments, before returning to Daniela in Zurich, where they reached the finals (beating top seeds Lisa Raymond and Stosur en route), losing a close three-set match to Black and Rennae Stubbs. They finished the year ranked No. 5, failing to qualify for the year-end championships.

Sugiyama played mixed doubles at two events: the French & the US Open. At Roland Garros, playing with Mirnyi, she lost in the first round. At the US Open, she partnered with Ullyett. The duo reached the quarterfinals, losing to eventual champions Hantuchová and Bhupathi. Entering the Doha with an 0–5 singles record, she managed to beat wildcard Selima Sfar. In the second round, she upset Myskina in three sets, needing several match points to close the match out. In her quarterfinal match against Julia Schruff, she had a comfortable win. She lost in the semifinal, in an epic match against Nadia Petrova. At 0–4 in the second, she won five consecutive games to 5–4. She won the doubles title with Hantuchová, defeating Yan and Zheng in the semifinal and Li Ting and Sun Tiantian in the final.

2006
In Rome, she and Hantuchová won the title, their third as a team and biggest title, beating Li and Sun; Black and Stubbs (No. 2), and Květa Peschke and Schiavone (No. 8).

At the French Open, 22nd seeded Ai beat Daniilidou in the first round, but lost to French qualifier Aravane Rezaï in the second. Deciding not to compete in the mixed, Ai and Daniella beat Caroline Dhenin and Mathilde Johansson , then squashed Sofia Arvidsson and Martina Müller; they escaped in three sets against Marion Bartoli and Shahar Pe'er. In the quarterfinals, they beat second-seeded Black and Stubbs. In the semifinals, they beat fourth-seeded Yan and Zheng but lost in two sets in the final to top-seeded Raymond and Stosur.

Wimbledon saw Sugiyama, the 18th seed, defeat 12th seed Martina Hingis in three sets to advance to the fourth round. The summer brought several bad singles losses, as well as doubles upsets. Sugiyama reached the final in Los Angeles, bowing to Ruano Pascual and Paola Suárez. In Montréal, she beat Aleksandra Wozniak and Anabel Medina Garrigues before losing to Kuznetsova. In doubles, partnering with Nathalie Dechy, they reached the quarterfinals.

At the US Open seeded 28th, she defeated Zuzana Ondrášková, and Tathiana Garbin before falling to second seed Justine Henin. In Beijing, she beat qualifier Alicia Molik, who was also her doubles partner in the event, in the first round. She then upset fourth-seeded Nicole Vaidišová in three sets before losing to Peng Shuai in another three-set match. She reached the final of a Tier-IV event in Seoul, losing to Eleni Daniilidou of Greece in a three-set final.

2007
The beginning of 2007 was better than the prior two years. She lost to Anastasiya Yakimova in the second round of the Australian Open (10–8 in the third), before beating her in Miami. Sugiyama and Daniela Hantuchová reached the quarterfinals, losing to eventual champions Black and Huber. In Tokyo, she reached the quarterfinals, losing in three sets to No. 1, Maria Sharapova. In Doha, she injured her toe, but recovered to reach the round of 16 in Indian Wells. In Miami, she fell to Dinara Safina in the third. She went 0–3 in Fed Cup play versus France, losing to both Tatiana Golovin and Dechy, but rebounded to win 50k Gifu with Ayumi Morita. The Japanese duo lost only one set en route to the title. She played in Berlin with Katarina Srebotnik. They swept Lourdes Domínguez Lino and Flavia Pennetta in a double bagel, but then fell to the second seeded Black and Huber the same day.

Her next tournament was Rome, where she beat Maria Kirilenko in a 2 hours 49 minutes three-set match. She lost to Pe'er in the next round. At Roland Garros, she reached the third round. She defeated Eva Birnerová in the first round and Meilen Tu in the second round, but then fell to Anna Chakvetadze, the 9th seed. In doubles, seeded seventh with Srebotnik, she defeated Lucie Hradecká and Renata Voráčová in the first round, Stéphanie Foretz and Camille Pin, and Pe'er and Safina in the second and third round. They then defeated Maria Elena Camerin and Gisela Dulko in the quarterfinals. They upset top seeds and defending champions Raymond and Stosur in the semifinals, winning in three sets to reach the French Open finals. They lost in the final in straight sets to Alicia Molik and Mara Santangelo.

At Wimbledon, seeded 26th, she beat wildcard Melanie South and Alizé Cornet. She lost against the second seeded Sharapova in the third round. In doubles, she and Srebotnik beat Andreea Ehritt-Vanc and Anastasia Rodionova; Émilie Loit and Nicole Pratt, and got a walkover from Bartoli and Meilen Tu in the third round. In the quarterfinals, they beat Elena Likhovtseva and Sun Tiantian. They came back from 1–6, 0–3 to beat top-seeded Raymond and Stosur, winning in three sets. They lost in the final to the second seeded Black and Huber.

During the US Open Series, she reached the third round of San Diego, where she defeated Sybille Bammer. She then lost to Chakvetadze. She reached two doubles semifinals in San Diego and Stanford with Srebotnik, losing both times to Victoria Azarenka and Chakvetadze. However, they won Toronto, defeating Peng Shuai and Yan in the quarterfinal, Molik and Santangelo, in the semifinal and Black and Huber in the final, winning their first title as a te.

At the US Open, Sugiyama lost in the second round to Ekaterina Makarova. Ai and Srebotnik impressively defeated Sun Shengnan and Ji Chunmei, and eventually defeated Michaëlla Krajicek and Agnieszka Radwańska. The team advanced to the quarterfinals after defeating Loit and Vania King, but lost to eventual champions Dechy and Safina. Srebotnik and Sugiyama continued their form and thus qualified for the Tour Championships, which were held in Madrid. The team, seeded second, defeated the Taiwanese duo of Chan Yung-jan and Chuang Chia-jung, but lost to Black and Huber in the final in a super tiebreak.

2008

In singles, Sugiyama's season started out badly, as she lost to Azarenka in Gold Coast and Gajdosova in Sydney. However, in Melbourne, her form returned, beating Vera Zvonareva in the first round and Tatiana Perebiynis in the second round, before losing to 12th seed Vaidišová. In doubles, she and Srebotnik lost in straight sets in Sydney to Yan/Zheng, the eventual champions. In Melbourne, they drew the Williams sisters in the second round and lost in two sets. Sugiyama's dream of a career slam died. In doubles, she reached the final in Antwerp with Peschke, as well as the semifinals in Doha and Dubai with Srebotnik.

On March 30 in the third round at the Tier-I event in Miami, she upset eighth seeded Hantuchová in an epic three-set match. She came back after losing a match point in the second set, as well as having served for the match twice in the second set. In the third set, she was down three to none, but still managed to win. It was her first top ten win since Beijing 2006. In the next round, she lost to Zvonareva. In doubles, she and Srebotnik won the title, beating Akiko Morigami and Alina Jidkova, Lucie Hradecká and Renata Voráčová, and Davenport and Hantuchová. They earned the title by beating Australian runners-up Azarenka and Pe'er and No.-1 team Black and Huber. It was their second team title, and Sugiyama's eighth Tier-I title.

Sugiyama won her ninth Tier I doubles title with Srebotnik at Charleston at the Family Circle cup, their third team title, scoring a two-sets win over Edina Gallovits-Hall and Olga Govortsova. Sugiyama broke the record for consecutive slam appearances woman with 57 as of her appearance in the 2008 Wimbledon tournament. Sugiyama made it to the third round of ladies' singles, losing to Alisa Kleybanova of Russia. At Stanford, she defeated Alexa Glatch and then beat world No. 11, Hantuchová. In the quarterfinals she beat Dominika Cibulková, saving three match points in the process. Sugiyama and Ayumi Morita represented their nation at the Summer Olympics, losing in the second round to the Williams.

2009

Ai started with a first-round loss to Stosur, and in the women's doubles a semifinal finish losing to Klaudia Jans and Alicja Rosolska in the Brisbane International partnering Hantuchová. In the Sydney International, Sugiyama made the semifinals eventually losing to Safina.

In the 2009 Australian Open, she made the third round losing to Jelena Janković. As the ninth seed in doubles playing with Hantuchová, they beat the No. 1 seeds, Black and Huber. In the third set "Hantuyama" were down 2–5, but rallied to take it to a tie-break, where they saved seven match points to win 12–10. In the semifinals, they beat Dechy and Santangelo to make it her first women's doubles final there. They were defeated by the Williams in two sets. A respiratory infection forced her to withdraw from the 2009 Open GDF Suez. Sugiyama entered the Dubai Tennis Championships and lost in the opening round to Bartoli in a tight three-set match. Sugiyama and Hantuchová also played doubles but withdrew because of the infection.

At the Indian Wells Open, Sugiyama and Hantuchová were seeded fifth in the women's doubles but lost to the pair Alla Kudryavtseva and Rodionova in the first round. In singles, she lost to qualifier Angela Haynes in the second round. At the Sony Ericsson open she lost her opening matches in singles and doubles, being beaten in the second round in singles after receiving a bye. Her loss in the doubles event with Hantuchová dropped her doubles ranking to No. 5. Sugiyama lost four consecutive singles matches in Miami, Stuttgart, Rome, and Madrid. However alongside Hantuchová, Sugiyama made the finals at the Rome Masters where they lost to the No. 7 seeds, Hsieh Su-wei and Peng. They reached the quarterfinals at the Madrid Masters where they lost to Stosur and Stubbs, whom she and Akgul Amanmuradova beat in the finals at Eastbourne, her 38th doubles title.

On June 22, she extended her record of consecutive Grand Slam appearances to 61 at Wimbledon, defeating the seeded Patty Schnyder in straight sets to break her eleven match losing streak. She lost in the third round to Hantuchová. In Stanford she lost to Sharapova in three sets, saving two match points in the second set. She then lost in the second round in Los Angeles to Radwańska. Sugiyama retired at the end of the 2009 tennis season after the Pan Pacific Open, held in her native country, Japan. A special ceremony for her was held at center court before the tournament. Ai planned a few months at home before concentrating on teaching youngsters at her tennis academy in Japan.

Major finals

Grand Slam tournaments

Women's doubles: 10 (3 titles, 7 runner-ups)

Mixed doubles

Olympic Games

Doubles: 1 bronze final

Year-end championships

Doubles: 2 (2 runner-ups)

WTA career finals

Singles: 13 (6 titles, 7 runner-ups)

Doubles: 71 (38 titles, 33 runner-ups)

ITF finals

Singles (1–2)

Doubles (4–1)

Grand Slam performance timelines

Singles

Doubles

Mixed doubles

WTA Tour career earnings

References

External links

 
 
 
 
 
 
 

French Open champions
Japanese female tennis players
Olympic tennis players of Japan
Sportspeople from Yokohama
Sportspeople from Kanagawa Prefecture
Tennis players at the 1996 Summer Olympics
Tennis players at the 2000 Summer Olympics
Tennis players at the 2004 Summer Olympics
Tennis players at the 2008 Summer Olympics
US Open (tennis) champions
Wimbledon champions
1975 births
Living people
Asian Games medalists in tennis
Hopman Cup competitors
Grand Slam (tennis) champions in women's doubles
Grand Slam (tennis) champions in mixed doubles
Tennis players at the 1994 Asian Games
Medalists at the 1994 Asian Games
Asian Games gold medalists for Japan
WTA number 1 ranked doubles tennis players
ITF World Champions